Maine Question 1 is a citizen-initiated referendum that appeared on the November 6, 2018 statewide ballot. It sought to implement a tax on higher incomes in Maine to fund in-home health care services for elderly and disabled Mainers, as well as to create a government board to administer the funds. The vote coincided with general elections for governor, U.S. Senate, U.S. House, the Maine Legislature, and other local elections. It qualified for the ballot due to supporters collecting signatures from registered Maine voters. It was defeated 62.86% to 37.14%.

Background
Supporters, led by the Maine People's Alliance, worked to place their proposal to increase access to home health care in Maine, in response to what they state is the fact that home health care workers have been overworked and underpaid for years. They note that wealthy Mainers have had three income tax reductions in the prior six years, and now pay a lower effective tax rate than most Mainers, while little has been done for home health care workers by the Legislature.

Maine Secretary of State Matthew Dunlap approved the wording of Question 1 on June 25, 2018. The question that will appear on the ballot is: "Do you want to create the Universal Home Care Program to provide home-based assistance to people with disabilities and senior citizens, regardless of income, funded by a new 3.8 percent tax on individuals and families with Maine wage and adjusted gross income above the amount subject to Social Security taxes, which is $128,400 in 2018? This tax is estimated to bring in $310 million a year. The proposal creates a nine member board called the Universal Home Care Trust Fund Board that would administer the funds.  Its initial members would be chosen by the Governor, Maine Senate President, and Speaker of the Maine House, who would each choose three to serve a three year term.  Subsequent members would be chosen in elections by home health care workers and patients.

Opponents have raised concerns that the proposal is unconstitutional. Former Maine Supreme Judicial Court Chief Justice Daniel Wathen has said the proposal is "deeply unconstitutional in many respects". Opponents also claim the proposal is a "trojan horse" to implement pro-labor union policies in the home health care field, as the proposal classifies home health care workers as state employees for purposes of collective bargaining. Opponents are further concerned that the additional tax will drive high-paid professionals from Maine. Supporters respond to the pro-labor claims of the proposal by conceding that language in the bill is meant to encourage, but not require, union membership, in order to improve working conditions and pay.

Campaign

Endorsements

Supporters
Caring Across Generations 
Center for Elder Care and Advanced Illness
Center for Medicare Advocacy
Common Defense
Justice in Aging
Maine AFL-CIO
Maine Alliance for Retired Americans
Maine Council of Churches
Maine Direct Care Alliance
Maine Education Association
Maine People's Alliance 
Maine Small Business Coalition
National Consumer Voice for Quality Long Term Care
Paraprofessional Health Institute
Well Spouse Association

Opponents
Maine State Chamber of Commerce
Maine Hospital Association
Maine Home Care & Hospice Alliance
 Alan Caron, businessman and independent candidate for Governor of Maine in 2018
 Terry Hayes, Maine State Treasurer and independent candidate for Governor of Maine in 2018
 Janet Mills, Maine Attorney General and Democratic nominee for Governor of Maine in 2018
 Shawn Moody, businessman and Republican nominee for Governor of Maine in 2018
 Bangor Daily News
 MaineToday Media newspapers; Kennebec Journal, Morning Sentinel, Portland Press Herald

Polling

References

External links
Home Care for All, supporters of the initiative
Stop the Scam Maine, opponents of the initiative

Healthcare reform legislation in the United States
2018 Maine ballot measures